Willem Janszoon captained the first recorded European landing on the Australian continent in 1606, sailing  from Bantam, Java, in the Duyfken. As an employee of the Dutch East India Company ( or VOC), Janszoon  had been instructed to explore the coast of New Guinea in search of economic opportunities. He had originally arrived in the Dutch East Indies from the Netherlands in 1598, and became an officer of the VOC on its establishment in 1602.

In 1606, he sailed from Bantam to the south coast of New Guinea, and continued down what he thought was a southern extension of that coast, but was in fact the western coast of the Cape York Peninsula of northern Queensland. He travelled south as far as Cape Keerweer, where he battled with the local Aboriginal people and several of his men were killed. As a consequence, he was obliged to retrace his route up the coast towards Cape York and then returned to Banda.

Janszoon did not detect the existence of the Torres Strait, which separates Australia and New Guinea. Unknown to the Dutch, the Spanish or Portuguese explorer Luis Váez de Torres, working for the Spanish Crown, sailed through the strait only four months later. However, Torres did not report seeing the coast of a major landmass to his south and is therefore presumed not to have seen Australia. Because the two separate observations of Janszoon and Torres were not matched, Dutch maps did not include the strait until after James Cook's 1770 passage through it, while early Spanish maps showed the coast of New Guinea correctly, but omitted Australia.

Overall, his voyage was not immediately recognized as significant at the time, as the Dutch East India Company was primarily interested in finding a faster route to the Spice Islands. However, Janszoon's voyage paved the way for further exploration of the Australian continent by the Dutch and other European powers.

Voyage

Janszoon travelled to the Dutch East Indies in 1598 for the Oude compagnies and became an officer of the Dutch East India Company ( (VOC) in Dutch) when it was established in 1602. After two trips back to the Netherlands, he returned to the East Indies for the third time in 1603 as captain of all the Duyfken. In 1605, he was at Banda in the Banda Islands, when—according to an account given to Abel Jansen Tasman, issued in Batavia on 29 January 1644—he was ordered by VOC President Jan Willemsz Verschoor to explore the coast of New Guinea. In September 1605, he left for Bantam in west Java—which the VOC had established as its first permanent trading in 1603—so that the Duyfken could be fitted out and supplied for its voyage.

On 18 November 1605, the Duyfken sailed from Bantam to the coast of western New Guinea.  Although all records of the voyage have been lost, Janszoon’s departure was reported by Captain John Saris.  He recorded that on 18 November 1605 "a small Dutch pinnace departed here for the discovery of the land called New Guinea, which, it is said, may yield a great amount of wealth".

No original logs or charts of Janszoon's voyage have been located and it is not known when or how they were lost.  Nevertheless, a copy was apparently made in about 1670 from Janszoon’s map of his expedition, which was sold to the Austrian National Library in Vienna in 1737. It can be deduced from this map that Janszoon then sailed to Ambon (the headquarters of the VOC), Banda, the Kai Islands, the Aru Islands and Deyong Point on the coast of Papua.

After exploring the coast of Papua the Duyfken rounded Vals Point and crossed the eastern end of the Arafura Sea—without seeing the Torres Strait—into the Gulf of Carpentaria, and on 26 February 1606 made landfall at a river on the western shore of Cape York Peninsula in Queensland, near the modern town of Weipa. Janszoon named the river , but it is now known as the Pennefather River. This is the first recorded European landfall on the Australian continent.

Turnback
According to the VOC’s instructions to Tasman (1644), Janszoon and his crew travelled along  of coast, from 5° south to 13° 45' south, but found

 He found the land to be swampy and infertile, forcing the explorers eventually to give up and return to Bantam due to their lack of "provisions and other necessaries". Nevertheless, it appears that the killing of some of his men on various shore expeditions was the main reason for their return—he turned back where his party had its greatest conflict with Aboriginal people, which he subsequently called Cape Keerweer, Dutch for "Cape Turnback".

Cape Keerweer is on the lands of the Wik-Mungkan Aboriginal people, who today live in various outstations and in the nearby Aurukun Mission station. The book Mapoon, written by members of the Wik-Mungkan people and edited by Janine Roberts, contains an account of this landing passed down in Aboriginal oral history.
 According to this account, some of Janszoon's crew angered the local people, by raping or coercing women into having sex and by forcing men to hunt for them. This led the locals to kill some of the Dutch and burn some of their boats. The Dutch are said to have shot and killed many of the Keerweer people before escaping. However, events from a number of different encounters, over many years, with Europeans may have been combined in these oral traditions. 

There is documented evidence suggesting that during this voyage, the Dutch landed near Mapoon and on Prince of Wales Island, with the map showing a dotted trajectory line to that island, but not to Cape Keerweer.

Return to Banda
After the alleged conflict, Janszoon retraced his route north to the north side of Vliege Bay, which Matthew Flinders called Duyfken Point in 1802.  He then passed his original landfall at Pennefather River and continued to the river now called Wenlock River.  This river was formerly called the Batavia River, due to an error made in the chart made by the Carstenszoon 1623 expedition. According to Carstenszoon, the Batavia River was a large river, which in 1606 "the men of the yacht Duijfken went up with the boat, on which occasion one of them was killed by the arrows of the natives".

Janszoon then proceeded past Skardon, Vrilya Point, Crab Island, Wallis Island, Red Wallis Island to t Hooge Eylandt ("the high island", now called Muralug Island or Prince of Wales Island), on which some of them landed.  The expedition then passed Badu Island to the Vuyle Bancken, the continuous coral reefs between Mabuiag Island and New Guinea.

Janszoon then sailed back to Banda via the south coast of New Guinea. On 15 June 1606, Captain Saris reported the arrival of

In 1618, it presented a memorandum in pursuit of this order that included the following:

Torres Strait
Willem Janszoon returned to the Netherlands apparently in the belief that the south coast of New Guinea was joined to the land along which he sailed, although his own chart did not verify his claim to have continuously followed the coastline where the Torres Strait is found.

  

In 1622, prior to Jan Carstenszoon’s 1623 exploration of the Gulf of Carpentaria, Hessel Gerritsz published a map, which included the coastline of part of the west coast of Cape York.  Although this map shows this coast as an extension of New Guinea, it includes a note that refers to Spanish maps that differed from the Dutch understanding of the area. It noted that while the Spanish maps were inconsistent with each other, they would, if confirmed, imply that New Guinea did not extend more than 10 degrees south, "then the land from 9 to 14 degrees must be separate and different from the other New Guinea".  The Spanish maps would have reflected Luis Váez de Torres's voyage through the strait named after him, which he completed in early October 1606, although the Dutch knew nothing of it.

Both Carstenszoon in 1623 and Tasman in 1644 were directed to attempt to find a passage in the area of Torres Strait, but failed. Following these explorations,  the Dutch continued to wonder whether there was a passage:  However, some Dutch maps, but not others like Gerritszoon's map of 1622, still showed Cape York and New Guinea as being contiguous, until James Cook, who was aware of Torres' voyage through Alexander Dalrymple, sailed through the strait on his first voyage in 1770.

Geographical coordinates

Notes

References
 
 
 
 
 
 
 

1605 in the Dutch Empire
1606 in the Dutch Empire
1606 in Australia
1606 in Oceania
17th century in the Dutch East Indies
Dutch East India Company
European exploration of Australia
History of Queensland
Maritime exploration of Australia
Maritime history of the Dutch East India Company